Palm River-Clair Mel is a census-designated place (CDP) in Hillsborough County, Florida, United States. The population was 21,024 at the 2010 census, up from 17,589 at the 2000 census. The census area includes the unincorporated communities of Clair-Mel City and Palm River. The ZIP code for Palm River-Clair Mel is 33619.

Geography
The CDP is bordered to the north and west by the city of Tampa, to the east by Brandon, to the southeast by Riverview, and to the south by Progress Village. The Palm River forms the northern boundary of the CDP.

U.S. Route 41 runs through the western part of the CDP, leading north into the eastern part of Tampa and south to Gibsonton. U.S. Route 41 Business runs west from US 41 and crosses East Bay/McKay Bay for a more direct route to downtown Tampa. U.S. Route 301 forms the eastern edge of the CDP, running north to East Lake-Orient Park and south to Riverview.

Demographics

As of the census of 2010, there were 24,379 people living in the community. The racial makeup of the community was 51% White, 35% African American, 0% Native American, 2% Asian, 0% Pacific Islander, 8% from other races, and 4% from two or more races. Hispanic or Latino of any race were 35% of the population.

There were 6,034 households, out of which 38.7% had children under the age of 18 living with them, 47.6% were married couples living together, 21.6% had a female householder with no husband present, and 24.8% were non-families. 19.3% of all households were made up of individuals, and 5.8% had someone living alone who was 65 years of age or older.  The average household size was 2.91 and the average family size was 3.33.

In the community the population was spread out, with 31.5% under the age of 18, 9.0% from 18 to 24, 29.1% from 25 to 44, 21.8% from 45 to 64, and 8.7% who were 65 years of age or older.  The median age was 32 years. For every 100 females, there were 95.0 males.  For every 100 females age 18 and over, there were 90.5 males.

The median income for a household in the community was $35,380, and the median income for a family was $38,035. Males had a median income of $27,796 versus $22,973 for females. The per capita income for the community was $14,593.  About 14.9% of families and 17.4% of the population were below the poverty line, including 26.1% of those under age 18 and 9.0% of those age 65 or over.

References

Census-designated places in Hillsborough County, Florida
Census-designated places in Florida
Populated places on Tampa Bay